Kenneth B. Anderson (March 17, 1909 – December 13, 1993) was an American art director and a writer at Walt Disney Animation Studios for 44 years.

Anderson studied architecture at the University of Washington, graduating with a B.Arch. in 1934. He was particularly influenced by faculty member Lionel Pries.

With the delineation skills he learned in architecture school, he soon secured a position at Disney. Anderson was a key player in some of the studio's most well-known animated films such as Snow White and the Seven Dwarfs (1937), Pinocchio (1940), Fantasia (1940), One Hundred and One Dalmatians (1961) and The Jungle Book (1967). He also worked on the development of Disneyland. Ken is a 1991 winner of the Disney Legends award for Animation & Imagineering.

Ken Anderson died in La Cañada Flintridge from a stroke at the age of 84.

Filmography

Architect/Designer
Disneyland and the EPCOT Center
 Gore's Mansion, Bloodmere Manor, and The Headless Knight legends for the Haunted Mansion to Disneyland (Disneyland Resort), Magic Kingdom (Walt Disney World) and also Tokyo Disneyland (Tokyo Disney Resort).

Honors
Winsor McCay Award 1982
Disney Legend (Animation & Imagineering) 1991

Further reading
Allan, Robin, Walt Disney and Europe: European Influences on the Animated Feature Films of Walt Disney, Indiana University Press, Bloomington and Indianapolis 1999.
Canemaker, John, Before the Animation Begins: The Art and Lives of Disney Inspirational Sketch Artists,  Hyperion, New York 1996 (especially pages 168-182, a full chapter devoted to Ken Anderson).
Ghez, Didier, Walt's People Volume 1: Talking Disney With The Artists Who Knew Him, Theme Park Press, 2005 (contains an entire interview with Ken Anderson from 1992 conducted by Paul F. Anderson).
Surrel, Jason, The Haunted Mansion: Imagineering a Disney Classic, 2016.

External links

Ken Anderson biography page at the New York Times
Ken Anderson – Disney Legends

1909 births
1993 deaths
University of Washington College of Built Environments alumni
Animators from Washington (state)
Animation screenwriters
Walt Disney Animation Studios people
Disney imagineers
Artists from Seattle
People from La Cañada Flintridge, California
20th-century American screenwriters